Children's Charter may refer to:

The Prevention of Cruelty to, and Protection of, Children Act 1889
The Children Act 1908